"Henrietta" is the debut single of Scottish rock band the Fratellis, released on 12 June 2006 as the first single their debut album, Costello Music (2006). It was their first UK top-20 hit, charting at number 19 on 18 June 2006. "Henrietta" was released alongside "Flathead" and "Creepin' Up the Backstairs" as a download for the Rock Band 2 video game on 10 February 2009.

Track listings

Charts

Weekly charts

Year-end charts

Certifications

References

2006 debut singles
2006 songs
The Fratellis songs